Mount Chocolat is a mountain located in Saint-Philémon, in the Bellechasse Regional County Municipality, in the administrative region of Chaudière-Appalaches, in Quebec, Canada.

The "Domaine du Cerf du Massif du Sud" has around fifty houses built on the mountainside.

Geography 
It is also part of the northwest sector of the Massif-du-Sud Regional Park.

Activities 

The ascent of the mountain offers a particular panorama of the valley; a belvedere is arranged at the top. A segment of the trail runs along the river and crosses the area of a maple grove. Hikers can see magnificent panoramas, particularly in the section of the palisade trail which runs along rock faces about 50 m high.

The trail of 10 km (minimum altitude of 474 m and maximum of 666 m) and 21 km (minimum altitude of 474 m and maximum of 917 m) of the Trail du Massif du Sud passes through Mont Chocolat. On the occasion of the night excursions are organized in groups in the company of a guide.

Place names 
The name of this mountain originates from its shape resembling chocolates filled with cherries. The toponym "Chocolate" was made official on March 16, 2004 at the Place Names Bank of the Commission de toponymie du Québec.

See also 
 Massif-du-Sud Regional Park
 Massif du Sud
 List of mountains of Quebec

References 

Appalachian summits
Summits of Chaudière-Appalaches
Notre Dame Mountains
Bellechasse Regional County Municipality
Mountains of Quebec under 1000 metres